Empedocles (444–443 BC) was a Greek pre-Socratic philosopher and a native citizen of Akragas, a Greek city in Sicily. Empedocles' philosophy is best known for originating the cosmogonic theory of the four classical elements. He also proposed forces he called Love and Strife which would mix and separate the elements, respectively.

Empedocles challenged the practice of animal sacrifice and killing animals for food. He developed a distinctive doctrine of reincarnation. He is generally considered the last Greek philosopher to have recorded his ideas in verse. Some of his work survives, more than is the case for any other pre-Socratic philosopher. Empedocles' death was mythologized by ancient writers, and has been the subject of a number of literary treatments.

Life
Although the exact dates of Empedocles' birth and death are unknown and ancient accounts of his life conflict on the exact details, they agree that he was born in the early 5th century BC in the Greek city of Akragas in Magna Graecia, present-day Sicily. Modern scholars believe the accuracy of the accounts that he came from a rich and noble family and that his grandfather, also named Empedocles, had won a victory in the horse race at Olympia in [the 71st Olympiad] OL. LXXI (496–95 BC), but little else can be determined with accuracy.

Primary sources of information on the life of Empedocles come from the Hellenistic period, several centuries after his own death and long after any reliable evidence about his life would have perished. Modern scholarship generally believes that these biographical details, including Aristotle's assertion that he was the "father of rhetoric", his chronologically impossible tutelage under Pythagoras, and his employment as a doctor and miracle worker, were fabricated from interpretations of Empedocles' poetry, as was common practice for the biographies written during this time.

Philosophy
Based on the surviving fragments of his work, modern scholars generally believe that Empedocles was directly responding to Parmenides' doctrine of monism and was likely acquainted with the work of Anaxagoras, although it is unlikely he was aware of either the later Eleatics or the doctrines of the Atomists. Many later accounts of his life claim that Empedocles studied with the Pythagoreans on the basis of his doctrine of reincarnation, although he may have instead learned this from a local tradition rather than directly from the Pythagoreans.

Cosmogony

Empedocles established four ultimate elements which make all the structures in the world—fire, air, water, earth. Empedocles called these four elements "roots", which he also identified with the mythical names of Zeus, Hera, Nestis, and Aidoneus (e.g., "Now hear the fourfold roots of everything: enlivening Hera, Hades, shining Zeus. And Nestis, moistening mortal springs with tears"). Empedocles never used the term "element" (stoicheion), which seems to have been first used by Plato. According to the different proportions in which these four indestructible and unchangeable elements are combined with each other the difference of the structure is produced. It is in the aggregation and segregation of elements thus arising, that Empedocles, like the atomists, found the real process which corresponds to what is popularly termed growth, increase or decrease. Nothing new comes or can come into being; the only change that can occur is a change in the juxtaposition of element with element. This theory of the four elements became the standard dogma for the next two thousand years.

The four elements, however, are simple, eternal, and unalterable, and as change is the consequence of their mixture and separation, it was also necessary to suppose the existence of moving powers that bring about mixture and separation. The four elements are both eternally brought into union and parted from one another by two divine powers, Love and Strife (Philotes and Neikos). Love is responsible for the attraction of different forms of what we now call matter, and Strife is the cause of their separation. If the four elements make up the universe, then Love and Strife explain their variation and harmony. Love and Strife are attractive and repulsive forces, respectively, which are plainly observable in human behavior, but also pervade the universe. The two forces wax and wane in their dominance, but neither force ever wholly escapes the imposition of the other.

As the best and original state, there was a time when the pure elements and the two powers co-existed in a condition of rest and inertness in the form of a sphere. The elements existed together in their purity, without mixture and separation, and the uniting power of Love predominated in the sphere: the separating power of Strife guarded the extreme edges of the sphere. Since that time, strife gained more sway and the bond which kept the pure elementary substances together in the sphere was dissolved. The elements became the world of phenomena we see today, full of contrasts and oppositions, operated on by both Love and Strife. Empedocles assumed a cyclical universe whereby the elements return and prepare the formation of the sphere for the next period of the universe.

Empedocles attempted to explain the separation of elements, the formation of earth and sea, of Sun and Moon, of atmosphere. He also dealt with the first origin of plants and animals, and with the physiology of humans. As the elements entered into combinations, there appeared strange results—heads without necks, arms without shoulders. Then as these fragmentary structures met, there were seen horned heads on human bodies, bodies of oxen with human heads, and figures of double sex. But most of these products of natural forces disappeared as suddenly as they arose; only in those rare cases where the parts were found to be adapted to each other did the complex structures last. Thus the organic universe sprang from spontaneous aggregations that suited each other as if this had been intended. Soon various influences reduced creatures of double sex to a male and a female, and the world was replenished with organic life.

Psychology
Like Pythagoras, Empedocles believed in the transmigration of the soul or metempsychosis, that souls can be reincarnated between humans, animals and even plants. According to him, all humans, or maybe only a selected few among them, were originally long-lived daimons who dwelt in a state of bliss until committing an unspecified crime, possibly bloodshed or perjury. As a consequence, they fell to Earth, where they would forced to spend 30.000 cycles of metempsychosis through different bodies before being able to return to the sphere of divinity. One's behavior during his lifetime would also determine his next incarnation. Wise people, who have learned the secret of life, are closer to the divine, while their souls similarly closer are to the freedom from the cycle of reincarnations, after which they are able to rest in happiness for eternity. This cycle of mortal incarnation seems to have been inspired by the god Apollo's punishment as a servant to Admetus.

Empedocles was a vegetarian and advocated vegetarianism, since the bodies of animals are also dwelling places of punished souls. For Empedocles, all living things were on the same spiritual plane; plants and animals are links in a chain where humans are a link too.

Empedocles is credited with the first comprehensive theory of light and vision. Historian Will Durant noted that "Empedocles suggested that light takes time to pass from one point to another.". He put forward the idea that we see objects because light streams out of our eyes and touches them. While flawed, this became the fundamental basis on which later Greek philosophers and mathematicians like Euclid would construct some of the most important theories of light, vision, and optics.

Knowledge is explained by the principle that elements in the things outside us are perceived by the corresponding elements in ourselves. Like is known by like. The whole body is full of pores and hence respiration takes place over the whole frame. In the organs of sense these pores are specially adapted to receive the effluences which are continually rising from bodies around us; thus perception occurs. In vision, certain particles go forth from the eye to meet similar particles given forth from the object, and the resultant contact constitutes vision. Perception is not merely a passive reflection of external objects.

Empedocles also attempted to explain the phenomenon of respiration by means of an elaborate analogy with the clepsydra, an ancient device for conveying liquids from one vessel to another. This fragment has sometimes been connected to a passage in Aristotle's Physics where Aristotle refers to people who twisted wineskins and captured air in clepsydras to demonstrate that void does not exist. The fragment certainly implies that Empedocles knew about the corporeality of air, but he says nothing whatever about the void, and there is no evidence that Empedocles performed any experiment with clepsydras.

Writings

According to Diogenes Laertius, Empedocles wrote two poems, one "On Nature" and the other "On Purifications" which together comprised 5000 lines. However, only approximately 550 lines of his poetry survive, quoted in fragments by later ancient sources. 

In the old editions of Empedocles, about 450 lines were ascribed to "On Nature" which outlined his philosophical system, and explains not only the nature and history of the universe, including his theory of the four classical elements, but also theories on causation, perception, and thought, as well as explanations of terrestrial phenomena and biological processes. The other 100 lines were typically ascribed to his "Purifications", which was taken to be a poem about ritual purification, or the poem that contained all his religious and ethical thought, which early editors supposed that it was a poem that offered a mythical account of the world which may, nevertheless, have been part of Empedocles' philosophical system.

However, with the discovery of the Strasbourg papyrus, which contains a large section of "On Nature" that includes many lines that were formerly attributed to "On Purifications" there is now considerable debate about whether the surviving fragments of his teaching should be attributed to two separate poems, with different subject matter, or whether they may all derive from one poem with two titles, or whether one title refers to part of the whole poem.

Legacy

According to Aristotle, he died at the age of sixty, even though other writers have him living up to the age of one hundred and nine. Likewise, there are myths concerning his death: a tradition, which is traced to Heraclides Ponticus, represented him as having been removed from the Earth; whereas others had him perishing in the flames of Mount Etna. Diogenes Laërtius records the legend that Empedocles died by throwing himself into Mount Etna in Sicily, so that the people would believe his body had vanished and he had turned into an immortal god; the volcano, however, threw back one of his bronze sandals, revealing the deceit. Another legend maintains that he threw himself into the volcano to prove to his disciples that he was immortal; he believed he would come back as a god after being consumed by the fire. Lucretius speaks of him with enthusiasm, and evidently viewed him as his model. Horace also refers to the death of Empedocles in his work Ars Poetica and admits poets the right to destroy themselves. In , a comedic dialogue written by the second century satirist Lucian of Samosata, Empedocles' final fate is re-evaluated. Rather than being incinerated in the fires of Mount Etna, he was carried up into the heavens by a volcanic eruption. Although a bit singed by the ordeal, Empedocles survives and continues his life on the Moon, surviving by feeding on dew.

Burnet states that Empedocles likely did not die in Sicily, that both the positive story of Empedocles being taken up to heaven and the negative one about him throwing himself into a volcano could be easily accepted by ancient writers, as there was no local tradition to contradict them.

Empedocles' death is the subject of Friedrich Hölderlin's play Tod des Empedokles (The Death of Empedocles) as well as Matthew Arnold's poem Empedocles on Etna.

See also
Empedocles (volcano)

Notes

References

Bibliography

Ancient Testimony

References

Further reading

External links

Empedokles: Fragments, translated by Arthur Fairbanks, 1898.
Empedocles  by Jean-Claude Picot with an extended and updated bibliography
Empedocles: Fragments at demonax.info

Deaths from fire
5th-century BC Greek people
5th-century BC philosophers
5th-century BC poets
Ancient Acragantines
Ancient Greek shamans
Pluralist philosophers
Ancient Greek physicists
Philosophers of Magna Graecia
Natural philosophers
Philosophers of science
Presocratic philosophers
Philosophers of love
Sicilian Greeks
490s BC births
430s BC deaths